The Ennis Site is an important archaeological site in the countryside southwest of Indianapolis in the U.S. state of Indiana.  Located near the town of Ellettsville in  Monroe County, the site extends into a portion of Owen County, near the town of Spencer.  As an important archaeological site, it was listed on the National Register of Historic Places in mid-1985; it was the first Monroe County archaeological site and the only Owen County archaeological site to receive this distinction.

References

Archaeological sites on the National Register of Historic Places in Indiana
Geography of Monroe County, Indiana
Geography of Owen County, Indiana
National Register of Historic Places in Monroe County, Indiana
National Register of Historic Places in Owen County, Indiana